Frederick Douglas may refer to:

 Frederic Huntington Douglas, a curator at the Denver Art Museum in Denver, CO
 Fred J. Douglas (1869–1949), US Representative
 Frederick Sylvester North Douglas (1791–1819), MP for Banbury

See also
 Frederick Douglass (disambiguation)